Dennis Morgan (1908–1994) was an American actor and singer. 

Dennis Morgan  may also refer to:

Dennis Morgan (American football) (1952–2015), former American football running back
Dennis Morgan (songwriter) (born 1952), songwriter and music publisher